Harold Edgar Ramsden Andrews (8 June 1897 – 20 May 1984) was an English professional association footballer who played as an inside forward. Born in Earby, he played eight matches and scored one goal in the Football League Third Division North for Nelson during the 1921–22 season before going on to become a prolific goalscorer in non-league football.

References

1897 births
1984 deaths
English footballers
Association football inside forwards
Nelson F.C. players
Bury F.C. players
Luton Town F.C. players
Rushden Town F.C. players
Chorley F.C. players
Torquay United F.C. players
Exeter City F.C. players
Merthyr Town F.C. players
Bath City F.C. players
Tunbridge Wells F.C. players
English Football League players